The history of shopping malls in Arkansas began in 1970 with the opening of Phoenix Village Mall in Fort Smith. As of 2016, the state has 21 malls and lifestyle centers. Six Malls, including Phoenix Village, have been demolished or converted to other uses.

The biggest mall is Central Mall in Fort Smith that has 141 stores.

Current

Defunct
Phoenix Village Mall, Fort Smith
Indian Mall, Jonesboro (May 1, 1968–February 2008)
Main Street Mall, Little Rock
Metrocentre Mall, Little Rock
Southwest Mall, Little Rock
University Mall, Little Rock (1967–October 27, 2007)
Pines Mall, Pine Bluff (1986-2020)
The Mall at Turtle Creek, Jonesboro

Canceled
Southern Hills Mall, Jonesboro
Otter Creek Mall, Little Rock
Summit Mall, Little Rock
The Shoppes at North Hills, North Little Rock

References

Arkansas
 
Shopping malls